"Dying Days" is a song by the American alternative rock group Screaming Trees. It is the fourth track on their seventh album Dust, released on June 25, 1996. Guitarist Mike McCready of Pearl Jam performed the guitar solo on the song. By this time, McCready had worked with Mark Lanegan in the band Mad Season. The lyrics of the song deal with the numerous deaths that occurred in Seattle's music community during that time.

Personnel
Adapted from the Dust liner notes.

Screaming Trees
 Gary Lee Conner – acoustic guitar, electric guitar, backing vocals
 Van Conner – bass guitar, backing vocals
 Mark Lanegan – lead vocals
 Barrett Martin – drums, percussion
Additional musicians
 21st Street Singers – backing vocals
 Mike McCready – guitar solo

Production and additional personnel
 George Drakoulias – production
 Andy Wallace – mixing
 Howie Weinberg – mastering

References 

1996 songs
Screaming Trees songs
Songs written by Gary Lee Conner
Songs written by Van Conner
Songs written by Mark Lanegan